Faster Pussycat is the first album by the band of the same name.
The album reached number 97 on the Billboard 200 chart. Videos were made for several of the songs on the album, including "Don't Change That Song", which had a video directed by Russ Meyer.

The song "Babylon" featured scratching by one time club DJ Riki Rachtman. Riki was Taime Downe's roommate and together they opened the nightclub Cathouse. 

The band performed "Cathouse" and "Bathroom Wall" in the film The Decline of Western Civilization Part II: The Metal Years, and they were interviewed in the segment as well.

The album was reissued on CD by UK-based company Rock Candy Records, with expanded liner notes and photos.

Style 
Unlike most of the rest of their music, this album is generally seen as just being a pure glam metal album without the later blues or industrial influences they would take in.

Also, although its original release met with modest success, the album is considered an incredibly influential classic within the glam metal musical community.

Track listing 
 "Don't Change That Song" (Taime Downe, Greg Steele) – 3:40
 "Bathroom Wall" (Downe) – 3:40
 "No Room for Emotion" (Downe, Brent Muscat) – 3:56
 "Cathouse" (Downe) – 3:42
 "Babylon" (Downe, Steele) – 3:14
 "Smash Alley" (Downe, Muscat) – 3:28
 "Shooting You Down" (Downe) – 3:46
 "City Has No Heart" (Downe, Muscat) – 4:19
 "Ship Rolls In" (Downe, Steele) – 3:26
 "Bottle in Front of Me" (Downe, Muscat) – 3:02

Reception 
In 2005, Faster Pussycat was ranked number 498 in Rock Hard magazine's book of The 500 Greatest Rock & Metal Albums of All Time.

Personnel 
Faster Pussycat
 Taime Downe – lead vocals
 Greg Steele – guitar, backing vocals
 Brent Muscat – guitar, backing vocals
 Eric Stacy – bass guitar, backing vocals
 Mark Michals – drums, backing vocals

Charts

References 

1987 debut albums
Faster Pussycat albums
Elektra Records albums